Scott James Timothy Robinson (born 22 November 1979) is an English singer best known for being a member of the boy band Five. He currently presents the Drivetime show on Radio Essex.

Early life
Robinson and his two sisters, Nicola and Hayley, lived in Pitsea, Essex. He attended Chalvedon Comprehensive School until year 9 when he left to move full-time to the Sylvia Young Theatre School.

He enjoyed initial acting success with small parts in Casualty, Hale and Pace, The Bill and EastEnders. Scott also performed on stage in London's West End & the Edinburgh Festival with Ron Moody in Peter Pan and in the National Youth Music Theatre Production of Whistle Down the Wind before turning his attention to music with Five.

Career

Five
In 1997, Robinson auditioned for Five, a new boy band-style group with "attitude and edge". Robinson was eventually selected to be part of the band along with Richard "Abs" Breen (now Abz Love), Ritchie Neville, Sean Conlon and Jason "J" Brown. Five subsequently were signed by Simon Cowell and BMG/RCA for a six-album deal. Five went on to enjoy massive success worldwide, selling over 20 million records in their four years together. The band split up on 27 September 2001, as Conlon had left the band, Neville had hurt himself on stage and Robinson's fiancée Kerry Oaker was having trouble with her pregnancy.

Post-split
After the split of Five, Robinson worked in radio and television, and was one of the leads in the UK regional touring musical, Boogie Nights 2. He also joined his friend Chris Brooks at local Essex radio station, Essex FM, in 2002 for a few months as a radio DJ. He starred in the UK regional theatre musical Boogie Nights 2 from late 2004 through most of 2005. In October 2008, Robinson appeared in Celebrity Scissorhands which coincides with the BBC charity Children in Need. He got into the final on 9 November after the contestants made an anonymous vote. He also appeared on an episode of Test the Nation in the Robinsons group.

He was a regular on Soccer AM at the beginning of the 2012–13 season, presenting the "Scott from Five Awards".

Unsuccessful first reunion and one-off appearances
On 17 September 2006, an announcement was made via Five's official Myspace page that a press conference was to be held at The Scala in central London on 27 September.  After a venue change due to a shooting at The Scala, the conference was moved to the Bar Academy Islington where it was confirmed that four of the five members would be reuniting (Conlon now being committed to his Sony deal). Five recorded new material for what was to be their fourth studio album, working with Guy Chambers, Swedish producer/songwriter Anders Bagge, and French DJs Trak Invaders. They also planned to tour in 2007.  By January 2007, Five had completed half of their album and were looking to be signed to a record label with new manager, Richard Beck. The album was expected to be released within the next few months. On 8 March 2007, at midnight, Five premiered one-minute clips of three brand new songs that were to have been on the new album. The songs, titled "70 Days", "Settle Down" and "It's All Good" can be heard on the band's official webpage and also on their Myspace page. Beck also secured an MTV documentary series titled Five: The Revive.

On 19 May 2007, only eight months after reforming, having failed to secure a lucrative enough record deal, Five announced via their website that the group would no longer be pursuing a comeback. Between 2010 and 2012, Robinson and Love did a small tour performing music from their catalogue. They were the only members of the band who continued to make appearances performing songs from Five's back-catalogue.

Second reunion
After Robinson's ex-bandmate Conlon appeared on The Voice UK on 24 March 2012 and failed to make it past the audition stage, Conlon reunited with his former bandmates to discuss the possibility of a second comeback.

On 19 April 2012, Brown wrote a post on Five fansite Warrington Warrior, saying that he had decided not to be a part of the reunion, and that he would like the fansite to be shut down, claiming that he no longer wants to be in the public eye as he felt it was an intrusion to his private life. Conlon, Neville, Love and Robinson confirmed the next day on Twitter that the post was indeed from Brown, and that they had received a letter with similar content from him. They apologised and gave a statement that Brown's personal opinion in no way represents Five as a band. The forum thread containing Brown's message has since been deleted, as per Robinson's and their manager's request. The other members then stated that they would continue as a four-piece, with plans for a new tour and new material.

On 17 October 2012, Robinson revealed via Twitter that Five had would be taking part in an ITV2 series called The Big Reunion at some point in 2013. In January 2013, it was reported that Five were looking to find a new member to replace Brown, and they were also having disagreement over the group's name. The band eventually decided to continue as a four-piece, and took part in a gig at the Hammersmith Apollo and later The Big Reunion arena tour.

In 2014, it was announced that Five and the boy bands from both series of The Big Reunion would go on The Big Reunion Boyband Tour later in the year. Abz revealed that he would not be taking part for financial reasons. Five reassured fans that Abz was not quitting the band altogether, but on 29 August he announced his departure via Twitter without letting Robinson, Conlon or Neville know first. Five are now continuing with just three members.

Personal life
Robinson began dating Kerry Oaker in 1997. On 11 July 2001, Oaker gave birth five weeks early to their first son, Brennan Rhys Robinson. On 28 September 2001, the day after Five split up, Robinson and Oaker got married at Stock Brook Golf and Country Club in Billericay. The rest of the band were also in attendance.

Their second son, Kavan, was born in 2006, followed by twin daughters, Bobbi-Rayne and Kaydi-Rose in January 2014. The family currently live in Pitsea, Essex.

Robinson is a fan of Arsenal F.C. and West Ham United.

In 2015, Robinson, his friend Chris Brooks and radio producer Alex Williamson launched a podcast called The Three Show. He also hosts the podcast The A to Z of Men alongside Brooks and producer Adam Foster, where they take on all the inner workings of a man. They have also released a Christmas Advent special, A to Z of Men Take on Christmas.

Discography

5ive (1998)
Invincible (1999)
Kingsize (2001)
Time (2022)

References

External links
 Scott Robinson (@Scottlarock5) | Twitter

1979 births
Living people
English pop singers
English male singers
Five (band) members
Musicians from Essex
People from the Borough of Basildon
Alumni of the Sylvia Young Theatre School